Marion Paton (1923 – December 2016) was a British accountant and code breaker.

Biography
Marion was born in Aldborough, North Riding of Yorkshire and, at age 13, moved to York to attend the Mill Mount Grammar School. Aged 18, after recently starting a job at an accountants firm in York, she was called up by the Foreign Office as a Foreign Office Civilian to Bletchley Park to aid the war effort. She was selected because she had achieved one of the highest national scores in her maths exam. From July 1944 to April 1945 she served in Block B, working on Naval decoding. For her service she is listed in the Roll of Honour at Bletchley Park and commemorated on the Codebreakers Wall.

Marion had left Bletchley earlier to return home to nurse her sick mother, who was dying of tuberculosis. Having signed the Official Secrets Act she never told her family details of her work during the war.

After the war she returned to the accountants. In 1948 she married James Paton, an RAF navigator.

References

1923 births
2016 deaths
Bletchley Park women
People from North Yorkshire
Foreign Office personnel of World War II
Bletchley Park people